Overland Mail Robbery is a 1943 American Western film directed by John English and written by Robert Creighton Williams and Robert Yost. The film stars Wild Bill Elliott, George "Gabby" Hayes, Anne Jeffreys, Alice Fleming, Weldon Heyburn and Kirk Alyn. The film was released on November 20, 1943, by Republic Pictures.

Plot

Cast  
Wild Bill Elliott as Wild Bill Elliott
George "Gabby" Hayes as Gabby
Anne Jeffreys as Judy Goodrich
Alice Fleming as Mrs. Patterson
Weldon Heyburn as John Patterson
Kirk Alyn as Tom Hartley
Roy Barcroft as David Patterson
Nancy Gay as Lola Patterson
Peter Michael as Jimmy Hartley
Bud Geary as Henchman Slade
Tom London as Sheriff

References

External links
 

1943 films
American Western (genre) films
1943 Western (genre) films
Republic Pictures films
Films directed by John English
American black-and-white films
1940s English-language films
1940s American films